The 1955–56 Maccabi Rehovot season was the club's 45th season since its establishment in 1912, and 8th since the establishment of the State of Israel.

At the start of the season, the league which started during the previous season was completed, with the club finishing 8th. The new league season, with the top division being re-named Liga Leumit, began on 3 December 1955 and was completed on 3 June 1956, with the club finishing 11th and relegating to Liga Alef.

Match Results

Legend

1954–55 Liga Alef
The league began on 6 February 1955, and by the time the previous season ended, only 20 rounds of matches were completed, with the final 6 rounds being played during September and October 1955.

Final table

Matches

1955–56 Liga Leumit

Final table

Matches

References

 

Maccabi Rehovot F.C. seasons
Maccabi Rehovot